Philippine Idol: The Final 12 is a compilation album from the talent show Philippine Idol, an Idol franchise in the Philippines. It was released by Musiko Records & Sony BMG Music Entertainment (Philippines), Inc. in the Philippines in 2006. The album consists of 13 tracks and performed by the top 12 contestants of the reality TV show.

Track listing
 "Hang On" – 04:27 (performed by Drae Ybanez)
 "Pangako" – 04:42 (performed by Stef Lazaro)
 "Nakapagtataka" – 04:57 (originally by the APO Hiking Society; performed by Pow Chavez)
 "Himala" – 04:22 (originally by Rivermaya; performed by Gian Magdangal)
 "Ngayon" – 05:46 (performed by Apple Chiu)
 "Iisa Pa Lamang" – 04:12 (performed by Jeli Mateo)
 "Tuwing Umuulan at Kapiling Ka" – 04:27 (originally by Basil Valdez, Regine Velasquez and Eraserheads; performed by Jan Nieto)
 "Araw Araw, Gabi Gabi" – 03:17 (performed by Armarie Cruz)
 "Hindi Magbabago" – 04:34 (performed by Remond Sajor)
 "Di Na Natuto" – 05:06 (originally by the Apo Hiking Society; performed by Ken Dingle)
 "Minsan Lang Kitang Iibigin" – 03:44 (originally by Ariel Rivera and Regine Velasquez; performed by Maureen Marcelo)
 "Next in Line" – 03:45 (originally by AfterImage; performed by Miguel Mendoza)
 "Kaleidoscope World" – 04:11 (originally by Francis Magalona; performed by The Final 12)

References

2006 compilation albums
Pop albums by Filipino artists
Compilation albums by Filipino artists
Pop compilation albums
Sony BMG compilation albums